Leszek I can be referred to:

 Leszek I, legendary ruler of Poland
 Leszek I ("the White"), High Duke of Poland